The Catholic Church in Algeria is part of the worldwide Catholic Church, under the spiritual leadership of the Pope in Rome.

Jurisdictions 
The country is divided into four Latin dioceses, including one archdiocese with two suffragan dioceses and one exempt diocese (ie immediately subject to the Holy See.)

Ecclesiastical province of Alger
 Metropolitan Archdiocese of Alger
Diocese of Constantine
Diocese of Oran

Exempt diocese
 Diocese of Laghouat (Immediately subject to the Holy See)

During French colonial rule, the Catholic population of Algeria peaked at over one million, but most of these left following Algeria's independence in 1962. There were about 45,000 Catholics residing in the country in the 1980's.

See also 

 List of Catholic dioceses in Algeria, including former jurisdictions, notably many titular sees
 List of Catholic churches in Algeria
 List of Saints from Africa
 List of Christian saints of Algeria

References

Sources and external links
 Official Website of the Catholic Church in Algeria
 Statistics relating to the Catholic Church in Algeria
 GCatholic.org.